Order of battle Tianjin–Pukou Railway Operation

Japan 

 2nd Army – General Toshizō Nishio ( left early Oct. 37),[1] [6]
 10th Division (Motorized Square Division)– Gen Rensuke Isogai [6][7] arrived early September) **
 8th Infantry Brigade
 39th Infantry Regiment
 40th Infantry Regiment
 33rd Infantry Brigade
 10th Infantry Regiment
 63rd Infantry Regiment
 10th Field Artillery Regiment
 10th Cavalry Regiment
 10th Engineer Regiment
 10th Transport Regiment
 16th Division – Lt. Gen.  Kesago Nakajima, 中島今朝吾[6][7]
 19th Infantry Brigade
 9th Infantry Regiment
 20th Infantry Regiment
 30th Infantry Brigade
 33rd Infantry Regiment
 38th Infantry Regiment
 22nd Field Artillery Regiment
 20th Cavalry Regiment
 16th Engineer Regiment
 16th Transport Regiment	
 109th Division Maj-General Yamaoka Shigeatsu, 山岡重厚 [7]
 31st Infantry Brigade
 69th Infantry Regiment
 107th Infantry Regiment
 118th Infantry Brigade
 119th Infantry Regiment
 136th Infantry Regiment
 109th Mountain Artillery Regt
 109th Cavalry Regiment
 109th Engineer Regiment
 109th Transport Regiment

Notes
 16th and 109th Divisions left campaign in early Oct. 37  to go to  Ningchin to participate in the Peiking – Hankow Railway Operation.  16h Division was sent to join the Battle of Shanghai.
 10th Division remained to conduct operations after the main force of 2nd Army left in Oct. 37.

Sources: 
[1] Hsu Long-hsuen and Chang Ming-kai, History of The Sino-Japanese War (1937–1945) 2nd Ed.,1971. Translated by Wen Ha-hsiung, Chung Wu Publishing; 33, 140th Lane, Tung-hwa Street, Taipei, Taiwan Republic of China.
Pg 191-195
Map 5

[2] Sino-Japanese Air War 1937-45

[4] Madej, W. Victor, Japanese Armed Forces Order of Battle, 1937-1945 [2 vols], Allentown, Pennsylvania: 1981

[6] Generals from Japan

[7] 陸軍師団長一覧 (Generals of  Division )

China 

Order of Battle Tianjin–Pukou Railway Operation (Early September 1937)[1]

1st Army Group – Gen. Sung Che-yuan
 19th Army - Feng Chih-an
 77th Corps - Feng Chih-an(concurrent)
 37th Division – Chang Ling-yun
 132nd Division – Wang Chang-hai
 179th Division – Ho Chi-feng *
 59th Corps - Chang Tse-chung
 38th Division – Huang Wei-kang
 180th Division – Liu Tse-chen, *
 181st Division – Shih Yu-san, *
 3rd Army - Pang Ping-hsun
 40th Corps - Pang Ping-hsun (concurrent)
 39th Division - Pang Ping-hsun (concurrent)
 49th Corps - Liu Tuo-chuan
 105th Division - Kao Peng-yun
 109th Division - Chao Yi
 3rd Cavalry Corps - Cheng Ta-chang
 4th Cavalry Division - Wang Chi-feng
 9th Cavalry Division - Cheng Ta-chang (concurrent)
 67th Corps - Wu Ke-jen
 107th Division - Chih Kuei-pi
 108th Division - Chan Wen-Chingi
 23rd Division
 12th Corps - Sun Tung-hsuan
 20th Division - Sun Tung-hsuan (concurrent)
 81st Division - Chan Shu-tang

Notes:
 [r]Reorganized Divisions [3]
 * 179th, 180th and 181st Divisions were formed from Peace Preservation Brigades and subordinate regiments of the 29th Army. [1]

Airforce - [2]
 None

Sources: 
[1] Hsu Long-hsuen and Chang Ming-kai, History of The Sino-Japanese War (1937–1945) 2nd Ed.,1971. Translated by Wen Ha-hsiung, Chung Wu Publishing; 33, 140th Lane, Tung-hwa Street, Taipei, Taiwan Republic of China. Pg 191-195, Map 5.
[2]  Sino-Japanese Air War 1937-45
[3] History of the Frontal War Zone in the Sino-Japanese War, published by Nanjing University Press.

Besides the eight German trained Reorganized Divisions were 12 other Reorganized Divisions with Chinese arms on the reorganized model with two German advisors:

2nd, 4th, 10th, 11th, 25th, 27th, 57th, 67th, 80th, 83rd, 89th Division

These were to be trained by large teams of German advisors like the earlier eight divisions but the start of the war with Japan precluded that.

Tianjin–Pukou Railway
Tianjin–Pukou Railway